Rocky Thompson is the name of:
Rocky Thompson (born 1977), Canadian ice hockey defenseman
Rocky Thompson (golfer) (1939–2021), American golfer
Rocky Thompson (American football) (born 1947), Bermudian player for NFL's New York Giants